The Mayor of Ekurhuleni is the head of the local government of South Africa's City of Ekurhuleni Metropolitan Municipality, established in 2000.

List of Mayors of Ekurhuleni

See also 

 City of Ekurhuleni elections

References 
Ekurhuleni
 

Lists of mayors of places in South Africa